A. robustus  may refer to:
 Alloophorus robustus, the bulldog goodeid, a fish species
 Amblysomus robustus, the robust golden mole, a mammal species endemic to South Africa
 Atrax robustus, the Sydney funnel-web spider, a notoriously dangerous funnel-web spider species found within a 100 km (62 mi) radius of Sydney, New South Wales, Australia

Synonyms
 Australopithecus robustus, a synonym for Paranthropus robustus, an extinct hominin species dated to have lived between 2.0 and 1.2 million years ago

See also
 Robustus (disambiguation)